The Rhodo-rpoB RNA motif is a conserved RNA structure that was discovered by bioinformatics.
Rhodo-rpoB motifs are found in Rhodobacterales.

Rhodo-rpoB motif RNAs likely function as cis-regulatory elements, in view of their positions upstream of protein-coding genes.  The apparently regulated genes encode subunits of RNA polymerase.

References

Cis-regulatory RNA elements regulating RNA polymerase genes
Non-coding RNA